Agulhasia is a genus of brachiopods belonging to the family Chlidonophoridae.

The species of this genus are found in South African Republic.

Species:

Agulhasia davidsoni 
Agulhasia densicostata

References

Brachiopod genera